Hans Frauenlob (born November 22, 1960) is a New Zealand curler originally from Barrie, Ontario.

Career
In 1997 Frauenlob was selected to represent New Zealand in their Men's curling team. Frauenlob played most of his career as third for skip Sean Becker. Frauenlob also was part of the first curling team to represent New Zealand at the Winter Olympics in 2006 in Torino. Skipped by Becker, the team finished in last place, with a 0–9 win–loss record.

After Frauenlob reached the age of eligibility to participate in senior curling events, he skipped New Zealand at the 2012 World Senior Curling Championships, but lost in the quarterfinals to Sweden's Connie Östlund. He also skipped New Zealand at the next year's championships, and went all the way to the final before losing to Canada's Rob Armitage. At the same time, he played in the 2013 World Mixed Doubles Curling Championship, and finished in fifth after losing in the quarterfinals. In 2015, he skipped New Zealand to a bronze medal at the 2015 World Senior Curling Championships.

Television commentator
Frauenlob has been a live sports commentator for a number of events.  His first commentary provided voiceover comments for Television New Zealand for the 2002 Winter Olympics.  He has done live commentary for World Curling Television from multiple Pacific-Asia and World Curling championships.  He did host broadcaster curling commentary for the 2018 Winter Olympics, worldfeed curling commentary for the 2022 Winter Olympics, as well as for multiple New Zealand Winter Games.  

He has done television baseball commentary for the Auckland Tuatara of the Australian Baseball League.

References

External links

Hans Frauenlob at New Zealand Curling

1960 births
Curlers at the 2006 Winter Olympics
Curlers from Simcoe County
Living people
New Zealand male curlers
New Zealand curling champions
Olympic curlers of New Zealand
Sportspeople from Barrie
Canadian emigrants to New Zealand
Pacific-Asian curling champions
21st-century New Zealand people